Hibiscus panduriformis, the yellow hibiscus, is a species of flowering plant in the family Malvaceae, native to much of Tropical Africa, Madagascar, Yemen, the Indian Subcontinent, and Myanmar. An erect shrub reaching , it is a minor weed of cotton.

References

panduriformis
Flora of West Tropical Africa
Flora of Northeast Tropical Africa
Flora of West-Central Tropical Africa
Flora of East Tropical Africa
Flora of South Tropical Africa
Flora of Madagascar
Flora of India (region)
Flora of Assam (region)
Flora of Sri Lanka
Flora of Bangladesh
Flora of Myanmar
Plants described in 1768
Taxa named by Nicolaas Laurens Burman